St Antonys Public School, Kanjirappally (SAPS) is a co-educational school located at Anakkal in Kanjirappally, Kottayam district, Kerala, India. It is owned and managed by the Catholic parish of St. Antony in Anakkal, in the Syro-Malabar Catholic Eparchy of Kanjirappally. A Christian minority institution, SAPS is affiliated to CBSE, New Delhi.

History
St. Antonys was founded in 1986 by the Rev. Dr. Antony Nirappel. Starting with twenty students and two teaching staff, the school has since expanded to include a separate kindergarten building and separate blocks for grades 1–6, 7–10, and a senior secondary wing.

Notable alumni 
Anna Baby - Playback Singer

References

External links 
 

Christian schools in Kerala
Catholic schools in India
Schools in Kottayam district
Educational institutions established in 1986
1985 establishments in Kerala
Syro-Malabar Catholic Eparchy of Kanjirappally